Eupithecia nishizawai is a moth in the family Geometridae first described by Inoue in 1988. It is found in Taiwan.

References

Moths described in 1988
nishizawai
Moths of Taiwan